The 1973–74 National Football League was the 43rd staging of the National Football League (NFL), an annual Gaelic football tournament for the Gaelic Athletic Association county teams of Ireland.

Kerry beat Roscommon in the final to complete a four-in-a-row.

Format 
Rob Robin system as usual.

Division One

Tables

Group A

Group B

Division two

Tables

Group A

Group B

Knockout stages

Division One

Division two

References

National Football League
National Football League
National Football League (Ireland) seasons